Newcastle Interchange is a transport interchange serving the city of Newcastle, New South Wales, Australia. It serves as the termini for NSW TrainLink's Central Coast & Newcastle Line and Hunter Line train services, Newcastle Light Rail services and Newcastle Transport bus routes.

Located in the inner Newcastle suburb of Wickham, it is to the west of the former Wickham station. The railway station opened 15 October 2017 with light rail services commencing on 17 February 2019.

History
As part of its plans to revitalise the Newcastle central business district, the Newcastle railway line was closed east of Hamilton on 25 December 2014 to allow construction of the Newcastle Light Rail line. Included in the project was a transport interchange.

The design for the new interchange was released by Transport for NSW in July 2015.  Originally to be named Wickham Transport Interchange, in December 2015 Transport for NSW lodged a proposal with the Geographical Names Board of New South Wales to have the station name changed to Newcastle Interchange. This was confirmed in December 2016.

Construction commenced in May 2016 after being delayed by a legal challenge to the line's closure. The railway station was opened on 15 October 2017 by Transport Minister Andrew Constance. Light-rail services commenced in February 2019.

A World War I honour roll was placed at the end of platform 1. Originally installed at Wickham Superior Public School, it was donated to the Newcastle Museum after the school had to be demolished following the 1989 Newcastle earthquake.

Services

Train
Newcastle Interchange is serviced by NSW TrainLink Central Coast & Newcastle Line services to and from Gosford & Sydney Central and Hunter Line services to and from Maitland, Muswellbrook, Scone, Telarah and Dungog.

Bus
In September 2015, the former Newcastle & Suburban Co-Operative store building adjacent to the transport interchange was purchased as the site for a proposed bus interchange. Demolition commenced in June 2018 and the new bus interchange opened on 5 July 2020.

Light rail
Newcastle Light Rail services commenced in February 2019 and operate from Newcastle Interchange through the Newcastle central business district to Newcastle Beach.

References

External links

Newcastle Interchange details Transport for NSW

Easy Access railway stations in New South Wales
Railway stations in the Hunter Region
Railway stations in Australia opened in 2017
Regional railway stations in New South Wales
Transport in Newcastle, New South Wales